The Amcoal Class E38 of 1993 is a South African industrial electric locomotive.

In 1993 Amcoal, now Anglo Coal, a wholly owned subsidiary of Anglo American, placed three Class E38 electric locomotives in service at its Kromdraai Colliery near Witbank, Mpumalanga.

Manufacturer
The 3 kV DC Class E38 electric locomotive is an electric-only version of the Class 38-000 electro-diesel locomotive which was designed for Spoornet by a consortium under the leadership of Siemens. In 1992, three of these locomotives were built for Amcoal by Union Carriage & Wagon (UCW) in Nigel, Transvaal.

The locomotives were delivered in 1993 and numbered E38-001 to E38-003. UCW did not allocate builder's numbers to the locomotives it built for Anglo Coal, but used the Amcoal unit numbers for their record keeping.

Spoornet’s Class 38-000
Prior to the production of the Class E38 for Amcoal Mines, UCW also built fifty Class 38-000 locomotives for Spoornet. The Class 38-000 is a dual mode electro-diesel locomotive, identical in exterior appearance and dimensions to the Class E38 but designed for 3 kV DC electric as well as diesel-electric operation and equipped with a  Caterpillar DITA 3508 diesel prime mover.

Service
The three Class E38s now serve at the Landau Colliery near Witbank.

References

External links

Bo-Bo locomotives
Cape gauge railway locomotives
3250
Railway locomotives introduced in 1993
Union Carriage & Wagon locomotives
1993 in South Africa